is a town in Fauske Municipality in Nordland county, Norway. It is also the administrative centre of Fauske Municipality. The lake Nervatnet lies on the southeast side of the town.

The town was established as a "town" in 1998 when the municipal council of Fauske Municipality designated it as such.  It is the site of the local municipal government. Fauske Church and the Fauske Upper Secondary School are both located in the town as well.  A historic area in the town is also part of the Nordland Museum.  There is various types of industry in Fauske, especially industries related to the local mining of marble.

Name
The town (originally the parish) is named after the old Fauske farm (Old Norse: Fauskar), since the first Fauske Church was built there (in 1867). The name is the plural form of fauskr which means "old and rotten tree".

Transportation
The town is a centre of transportation for the region.  The junction of the European route E06 and Norwegian National Road 80 highways is located in the town. The Nordlandsbanen railway line also runs through the town, stopping at Fauske Station.  Norwegian County Road 830 begins at Fauske and heads southwest to the Sulitjelma area.

Climate
Fauske is located inside the Arctic circle and it has 24 hours of daylight from early May to the beginning of August, with midnight sun from the beginning of June to the second week of July. The town nearly experiences polar night in December because it has sunrise at 11 am and sunset before noon. Average 24-hour temperatures in Fauske are below freezing from mid-November to the last part of March, but the ice-free Skjerstad Fjord moderates winter temperatures. Summer starts in June with moderate summer temperatures lasting until early September. 

Daytime temperatures are usually significantly warmer than the 24-hr average from March to September, while there is very little diurnal temperature variation from November to early February as the sun is very low or below the horizon all day. Southwesterly winds can bring thaws anytime in winter, but not in the mountains, which usually get large amounts of snow in winter—the main reason for the large glaciers and the hydropower in the area.

Media gallery

See also
List of towns and cities in Norway

References

External links

Fauske
Cities and towns in Norway
Populated places in Nordland
Populated places of Arctic Norway
1998 establishments in Norway